Luke Warm Sex is a six-part Australian television comedy documentary series starring Melbourne comedian Luke McGregor, about body image and sexuality. It first screened on Wednesday 16 March 2016 at 9 p.m. on the ABC.

Overview
Luke McGregor takes on a new challenge of improving his sex life with the help of therapists, sex coaches and scientists.

Episodes
 Episode 1: "Fear of Being Nude"
 Episode 2: "Comfortable with Contact"
 Episode 3: "How Do I Prepare My Body for Sex?"
 Episode 4: "It's a Pleasure to Meet You"
 Episode 5: "Getting Intimate with Intimacy"
 Episode 6: "Spicing Up Our Sex Lives"

References

External links
 

2016 Australian television series debuts
2016 Australian television series endings
Australian Broadcasting Corporation original programming
2010s Australian comedy television series
Television series by Northern Pictures